Sir Kurt George Matthew Mayer Alberti,  (born 27 September 1937) is a British doctor.  His long-standing special interest is diabetes mellitus, in connection with which he has published many research papers and served on many national and international committees.  In the 1970s, Alberti published recommendations for the management of diabetic ketoacidosis, a serious metabolic emergency  which affects people suffering from severe insulin deficiency.  This 'Alberti regime' rationalised the use of insulin and fluid therapy in this condition to the undoubted benefit of many patients.

Alberti served as national clinical director for emergency access from September 2002 to March 2009. He has been professor and dean of medicine at the University of Newcastle upon Tyne and president of the Royal College of Physicians.

Alberti drove controversial changes to emergency care in the UK, leading to some hospitals losing their status as emergency care centres.

Personal life
Alberti first married in 1964 and had three sons with his first wife. In 1998, he married Stephanie Amiel.

Education 
 Balliol College, Oxford (MA; DPhil 1964; BM BCh 1965; Honorary Fellow 1999).

Career 
 Research Fellow, Harvard University, 1966–69
 Research Officer, Department of Medicine, Oxford University, 1969–73
 Professor of Chemical Pathology and Human Metabolism, University of Southampton, 1973–78
 Professor of Clinical Biochemistry and Metabolic Medicine, University of Newcastle, 1978–85
 Professor of Medicine, Newcastle upon Tyne, 1985–2002 (Dean of Medicine, 1995–97)
 Professor of Metabolic Medicine, Imperial College London, 1999-2002
 National Clinical Director for Emergency Access, 2002-2009
 Chair of King's College Hospital NHS Foundation Trust, 2011-2015
 Senior Research Investigator, Imperial College, London, 2002-

Honours 
 Fellow of the Royal College of Physicians (president, 1997–2002)
 Fellow of the Royal College of Physicians of Edinburgh
 Fellow of the Royal College of Pathologists
 Fellow of King's College London
 Member, World Health Organization Expert Advisory Panel on Diabetes, 1979–
 President, International Diabetes Federation, 2000-03 (Vice-President, 1988–94)
 Vice-Chairman, British Diabetic Association, 1996–99
 Vice President, Diabetes UK, 2000–
 Founder FMedSci 1998 (Member of Council, 1998–2002)
 Knight Bachelor for services to Diabetic Medicine in the New Year Honours 2000
 Member of the Advisory Council of the Campaign for Science and Engineering

Notes

 RCP Presidents

1937 births
Living people
Civil servants in the Ministry of Health (United Kingdom)
British Jews
British diabetologists
20th-century Sephardi Jews
21st-century Sephardi Jews
Knights Bachelor
Fellows of the Royal College of Physicians
Presidents of the Royal College of Physicians
National Health Service people
Academics of the University of Southampton
Academics of Newcastle University
Academics of Imperial College London
Fellows of King's College London